Raptor was a Thai musical duo popular in the 1990s. The duo consisted of two luk khrueng (people of mixed Thai and Caucasoid) boys Joni Anwar and Louis Scott. Their albums Raptor, Waab Boys, Day Shock and Raptor Goodbye each sold over a million copies.

History
Joni Anwar started as child actor in the 1992 Thai movie Toe Laaw Tong Toe (โตแล้วต้องโต๋). They studied in Bangkok Patana School together. Raptor was born because Suea Thanapol, their producer, had the idea after seeing the movie Jurassic Park, as well as the United States' Kris Kross.

They had naughty activities including dropping a water balloon on a truck. The truck was full of tape cassettes and was damaged.

Raptor was successful in the 1990s in Thailand and Asia. They sold a million more tape cassettes marketing and tour concerts in Bangkok and other provinces. Joni eventually left to study overseas. They decided to end Raptor with albums Raptor Goodbye and Raptor The Memory. They had another studio album after they split-out of Raptor. They performed a reunion concert in 2011 and continued thereafter.

Members
Joni Anwar (Indonesian-Scottish)
Louis Scott (Thai-Scottish)

Discography

Studio albums
Raptor 1994
Waab Boys 1995
Day Shock 1996
Raptor Goodbye 1998
Raptor The Memory 1999

Compilation albums
superteens 1996
The Next 1997
The Celebration 2001

Concerts
 Raptor Concert Episode Joni & Louis Ta Lui Hijack 1994 MBK Hall
 Pepsi-Teenology Concert Waab-Z 1996 Hua Mark Indoor Stadium
 Waab Boys Waab Concert 1996 Island Hall Fashion Island
 Yaak Concert 1996 Island Hall Fashion Island
 Munchos Dance Concert Raptor OH Yes! 1998 MBK Hall
 Goodbye Concert Sayonara Raptor 1998 MBK Hall
 RAPTOR 2011 The Concert 2011 Royal Paragon Hall Siam Paragon
 RAPTOR 2012 Encore Concert 2012 Impact Arena

Jam Concert 

 RS. Meeting Concert Book Kaow Olaveng Rongpleang Nabann (Th:บุกเกาะอลเวงร้องเพลงหน้าบาน) (22 Oct 1994) MBK Hall
 RS. Freshy Jam Concert (11 Sep 1995) Thai Army Sports Stadium 
 Super Teen Super Concert (17 Feb 1996) Hua Mark Indoor Stadium
 RS. Meeting Concert Tam Ra Beab Ten (TH:ตามระเบียบ...เต้น) (2 Feb 1997) MBK Hall
 Pepsi The Next Generation Concert (18 Jan 1998) MBK Hall
 The Celebration Concert (10 Feb 2001) Hua Mark Indoor Stadium
 RS. Meeting Concert Star Mission Mun Lood Lok (TH:มันหลุดโลก) (22 Dec 2001) Hua Mark Indoor Stadium
 RS. Meeting Concert Return 2013 (18-19 May 2013) Impact Arena
 The Next Venture Concert 2016 ( 6 Mar 2016) Impact Arena

Filmography
Romantic Blue (โลกทั้งใบให้นายคนเดียว) 1995 Guest lead role by Somchai Khemklad, Suthida Kasemsan Na Ayutthaya
 Extreme Game (เด็กระเบิดยืดแล้วยึด) 1996 lead role by Thanis Yaisamoe, Suthida Kasemsan Na Ayutthaya
Luk Liew Fiew Ah! 2012

Series
Nueng Fah Lang Ka Diew (หนึ่งฟ้าหลังคาเดียว) 2002
Sawasdee Bangkok (สวัสดีบางกอก) 2009 segment Bangkok Blues
Dok Som See Thong (ดอกส้มสีทอง) 2011
Bupphesanniwat (บุพเพสันนิวาส) 2018 (Louis Scott as Constantine Phaulkon)

References

Citations

General references 

 - a day เล่มนี้ ได้ใจ ไปเต็มๆ เลย กับหน้าปกศิลปิน เก่าๆ RS ใครเป็นใคร แค่จำประโยดเพลงเด็ดๆ ได้ ก็แว่ะเข้ามาคร่า
 
 

1994 establishments in Thailand
1998 disestablishments in Thailand
Thai pop music groups
Thai musical duos
Musical groups from Bangkok